Petr Pláteník (born 16 March 1981) is a Czech volleyball player. He plays on position outside spiker.

Sporting achievements

Clubs 
Czech Championship:
  2002, 2013
  2001
Belgium Supercup:
  2002, 2003
Belgium Cup:
  2003, 2004
Belgium Championship:
  2003, 2004
Greece Championship:
  2005
Italian Cup:
  2006
CEV Cup:
  2009
Turkey Cup:
  2010
Turkish Championship:
  2010
  2011, 2012

National team 
European League:
  2004

Individual awards 
 2004: MVP European League

References

External links
 LegaVolley profile
 Volleybox profile
 GreekVolley profile
 CEV profile

1981 births
People from Havlíčkův Brod District
Living people
Czech men's volleyball players
Panathinaikos V.C. players